Villa Hidalgo is a village in the municipality of Tuzantán, Chiapas, Mexico. As of 2010, the village had a population of 1,089.

References

Populated places in Chiapas